Under the Sky of Spain (Spanish:Bajo el cielo de España) is a 1953 Mexican-Spanish drama film directed by Miguel Contreras Torres and starring Gustavo Rojo and Marisa de Leza.

Cast

References

Bibliography 
 Emilio García Riera. Breve historia del cine mexicano: primer siglo, 1897-1997. Instituto Mexicano de Cinematografía, 1998.

External links 
 

1953 drama films
Spanish drama films
Mexican drama films
1953 films
1950s Spanish-language films
Films directed by Miguel Contreras Torres
Films scored by Juan Quintero Muñoz
Mexican black-and-white films
Spanish black-and-white films
1950s Spanish films
1950s Mexican films